The 2000–01 League of Ireland First Division season was the 16th season of the League of Ireland First Division.

Overview
The First Division was contested by 10 teams and Dundalk F.C. won the division.

Final table

Promotion/relegation play-off
Third placed Kilkenny City played off against Waterford United who finished in tenth place in the 2000–01 League of Ireland Premier Division. The winner would compete in the 2001–02 League of Ireland Premier Division.

1st Leg

2nd Leg 

UCD win 4-2 on penalties after extra time and retain their place in the Premier Division.

See also
 2000–01 League of Ireland Premier Division

References

League of Ireland First Division seasons
2000–01 in Republic of Ireland association football
Ireland